Augustine McIntyre Jr. (July 19, 1876 – September 6, 1954) was a career officer in the United States Army. A member of the Field Artillery branch, he was a veteran of  the Philippine–American War, World War I, and World War II. He attained the rank of brigadier general, and was most notable for his command of several artillery brigades during the First World War, and command of the Field Artillery School at the start of the Second World War.

Early life and education

McIntyre was born on July 19, 1876 in Chattanooga, Tennessee. He attended the United States Military Academy, graduating with the class of 1900.  McIntyre played baseball on the Army team.

Career
McIntyre received a commission with the cavalry.  He transferred to the artillery and served with the 6th Artillery.

McIntyre was promoted to brigadier general on April 15, 1918.

McIntyre commanded the 13th Field Artillery.  He then commanded the Field Artillery School at Fort Sill, Oklahoma. He was awarded the Army DSM for his service during World War I. The citation reads:

He taught military science and tactics at the University of Missouri.

Personal life
McIntyre married Jane Clemens Swigert on May 10, 1906. She died in 1950.

Death and legacy
McIntyre died at Brooke Army Medical Center on September 6, 1954, and was buried at Fort Sam Houston National Cemetery.

References

External links

1876 births
1954 deaths
United States Army Field Artillery Branch personnel
Military personnel from Tennessee
Burials at Fort Sam Houston National Cemetery
People from Chattanooga, Tennessee
Recipients of the Distinguished Service Medal (US Army)
United States Military Academy alumni
University of Missouri faculty
United States Army generals of World War I
United States Army generals